Habibabad is a town in Pakistan.

Habibabad may also refer to:
Habibabad, Fars
Habibabad, Rostam, Fars Province
Habibabad, Hamadan
Habibabad, Isfahan
Habibabad, Jarqavieh Sofla, Isfahan County, Isfahan Province
Habibabad, Natanz, Isfahan Province
Habibabad, Masjed Soleyman, Khuzestan Province
Habibabad, Shushtar, Khuzestan Province
Habibabad-e Mazdak, Kohgiluyeh and Boyer-Ahmad Province
Habibabad, Mazandaran
Habibabad, Razavi Khorasan
Habibabad, Nukabad, Khash County, Sistan and Baluchestan Province
Habibabad, Tehran
Habibabad District